Montavian Lamar Rice-Jordan (born January 8, 1999) is an American football linebacker for the Tennessee Titans of the National Football League (NFL). He played college football at Georgia and was drafted by the Titans in the third round of the 2021 NFL Draft.

Early years
Rice attended St. John Paul II Catholic High School in Huntsville, Alabama his freshman year before transferring to James Clemens High School in Madison, Alabama where he spent his final three years. As a senior in 2016, he had 137 tackles, one sack, four interceptions and four touchdowns. Rice originally committed to play college football at Louisiana State University (LSU) but later changed the commitment to the University of Georgia.

College career
Rice played in 14 games with one start as a true freshman at Georgia in 2017 and had 22 tackles. As a sophomore in 2018, he started five of nine games recording 59 tackles and one sack. Rice started all 14 games his junior year in 2019 and was named a co-winner of the team's Vince Dooley Defensive MVP after leading the team with 89 tackles. Rice returned to Georgia for his senior season in 2020 rather than enter the 2020 NFL Draft.

Professional career

Rice was drafted by the Tennessee Titans in the third round, 92nd overall, of the 2021 NFL Draft. On July 24, 2021, Rice signed his four-year rookie contract with the Titans.

Rice entered his rookie season as a backup inside linebacker behind Rashaan Evans, Jayon Brown, and David Long Jr. He suffered an ankle injury in Week 12 and was placed on injured reserve on November 30, 2021.

Rice was placed on the Active/PUP list on July 23, 2022. He was placed on the reserve list on August 24. He was activated on October 8.

References

External links
Georgia Bulldogs bio

1999 births
Living people
Sportspeople from Huntsville, Alabama
Players of American football from Alabama
American football linebackers
Georgia Bulldogs football players
Tennessee Titans players